was a Japanese film director known for social realist filmmaking informed by a left-wing perspective. His most noted films include An Inlet of Muddy Water (1953) and Bushido, Samurai Saga (1963).

Life
Although leaning towards left-wing politics already at Tokyo University, where he joined a Communist student group, Imai's directing career, after serving as continuity writer at J.O. studios (later Toho), started in 1939 with a series of films promoting the war efforts of the militarist regime. Later calling these films "the biggest mistake of my life", he soon turned to socially conscious themes after the war. Aoi sanmyaku (1949), although a light comedy, observed the educational system, and was successful both with moviegoers and critics. While his 1950 drama Until We Meet Again portrayed a young couple's doomed love against the backdrop of the Pacific War, the 1953 anti-war film Tower of Lilies was a stark account of untrained female students forced into aiding military troops during the final stage of the Battle of Okinawa. Other films addressed the present-day struggles of day labourers (And Yet We Live), troubled youths (Jun'ai monogatari), poor farmers (The Rice People) and children of interracial relationships (Kiku to Isamu). Yet the films regarded his most important of this era had a historical instead of a contemporary setting: An Inlet of Muddy Water (1953), based on stories by Ichiyō Higuchi, took a look at the fate of a group of women during the Meiji era, Night Drum (1958), scripted by Kaneto Shindo, denounced the Samurai honour codex in a tale about adultery and revenge during the Edo period. Imai returned to the latter subject in the critically acclaimed Bushido, Samurai Saga (1963) and in Revenge (1964).

Legacy
Japanese critics tended to define Imai's way of storytelling as "nakanai realism", a "realism without tears", a fact questioned by film historian Joan Mellen who saw his work repeatedly "close to the sentimental". In an interview, Imai himself summed up his films as "centered on human tragedies", which locates them close to the works of Keisuke Kinoshita who addressed similar topics (though in a less political manner) and whom Imai admired. While film historians acknowledge Imai's solid directorial skills, the lack of a consistent style, and tendency to focus more on consequences than analysis of his themes, have been recurring subjects of criticism.

Selected filmography
 1946: Minshū no Teki
 1949: Aoi sanmyaku
 1950: Until We Meet Again (Mata au hi made)
 1951: And Yet We Live (Dokkoi ikiteru)
 1953: Tower of Lilies (Himeyuri no tō)
 1953: An Inlet of Muddy Water (Nigorie)
 1956: Mahiru no ankoku
 1957: Jun'ai monogatari
 1957: The Rice People (Kome)
 1958: Night Drum (Yoru no tsuzumi)
 1959: Kiku to Isamu
 1963: Bushido, Samurai Saga (Bushidō zankoku monogatari)
 1964: Revenge (Adauchi)
 1967: Satōgashi ga kowareru toki
 1976: Brother and Sister (Ani imōto)
 1981: Yuki

Awards
Berlin Film Festival
Imai won the Silver Bear for Best Director at the 1958 8th Berlin International Film Festival for his work on Jun'ai monogatari. At the 1963 13th Berlin International Film Festival his film Bushido, Samurai Saga won the Golden Bear.

Blue Ribbon Awards
Imai won the Blue Ribbon Award for Best Director four times: 1950 for Until We Meet Again, 1953 for Tower of Lilies and An Inlet of Muddy Water, 1956 for Mahiru no ankoku and 1957 for Jun'ai monogatari and The Rice People. Until We Meet Again, An Inlet of Muddy Water, Mahiru no ankoku, The Rice People and Kiku to Isamu were winners in the Best Film category.

Kinema Junpo Awards
Imai received the Kinema Junpo Award for Best Director for Mahiru no ankoku, The Rice People and Kiku to Isamu. All three films plus Until We Meet Again and An Inlet of Muddy Water were also awarded Best Film.

Mainichi Fim Awards
Imai was awarded Best Director for An Inlet of Muddy Water at the 1953 8th Mainichi Film Awards, where An Inlet of Muddy Water was also awarded Best Film.

References

External links
 
 
 

Japanese film directors
Samurai film directors
1912 births
1991 deaths
People from Tokyo
Silver Bear for Best Director recipients
Directors of Golden Bear winners